The Harimaya Bridge is a 2009 film written and directed by American filmmaker Aaron Woolfolk. It was filmed in Kōchi Prefecture, Japan and San Francisco, California, U.S.A. The film had a nationwide theatrical release in Japan in 2009 and an independent theatrical release in the United States in 2010. The film was released on DVD in Japan at the end of 2009 and was released on DVD and video-on-demand by Funimation in the United States in 2011.

The title references the Harimaya bridge in Kochi city, which is connected to a well-known Japanese story about forbidden love.

The film is produced by Ko Mori and Aaron Woolfolk. Executive producers are Danny Glover, Naoshi Yoda, and John Kim. Co-producers are Muneyuki Kii and Tatsuya Kimura. Associate producers are James Lane and Lee Rudnicki.

The film's theme song, "Shūten: Kimi no Ude no Naka", was sung by Japanese singer Misono, who released the song as her 13th single.

Plot
The story concerns an American man who must travel to rural Japan after his estranged son dies there in a traffic accident. While there, he discovers some secrets his son left behind. The Harimaya Bridge is a film about racism and forgiveness. The main character lost his son and he had to go to Japan to retrieve some of his sons paintings. The father (main character) had a very strong dislike for the Japanese people. He was very rude towards them in the beginning. He disrespected their culture as well on several occasions. One time he ignored the Japanese people when they told him to take off his shoes when he entered the home he was staying them. It took them a few minutes to get him to respect their wish and take off his shoes.

While the father was in Japan he found out many things he never knew about his son. For one, his son was married to a Japanese woman and they had a child together. The father and his son clearly did not share a strong, loving and respectful relationship. In one scene, The two got in a fight and the father kicked the son out of the home. This was the last straw for the son and may have caused him to move to Japan and keep his life under wraps from his father. Towards the end of the film the father experienced some things that made him confront his hatred and disrespectfulness towards the Japanese. His first encounter with his granddaughter is what made him change.

Cast
 Ben Guillory as Daniel Holder
 Saki Takaoka as Noriko Kubo
 Misa Shimizu as Yuiko Hara
 Danny Glover as Joseph Holder
 Misono as Saita Nakayama
 Honoka Ishibashi as Emi Osaki
 Victor Grant as Mickey Holder
 A'da Alison Woolfolk as Lindsey Holder
 Miho Shiraishi as Kayo Takeuchi
 Akira Hamada as Principal Shimura
 Junkichi Orimoto as Tomoki Shide
 Peter Coyote as Albert Tunney
 Hajime Yamazaki as Kunji Inoue
 Toshiyuki Kitami as Mr. Kubo
 Yukiko Kashiwagi as Ms. Kubo

References

External links

 The Harimaya Bridge - U.S. Official website, link decayed and is now just a page with some pictures of bridges.
 The Harimaya Bridge はりまや橋 - Japanese Official website (ja)
 
 

2009 films
Japanese drama films
2000s Japanese-language films
African-American films
Films set in San Francisco
Japan in fiction
Japan in non-Japanese culture
Funimation
Films shot in Kōchi Prefecture
Films set in Kōchi Prefecture
2000s English-language films
American drama films
2000s American films